Jagmeet Singh Bal (born 13 December 1972) is a popular Indian music video director who is known for his traditional and religious Punjabi music videos.

Biography
Bal was born in Chandigarh, India into a Punjabi Sikh family. Since childhood, Jagmeet had a strong inclination towards fine arts. Jagmeet completed his Bachelor of Fine Arts (BFA) in Commercial Design and Advertising from Government College of Arts, Chandigarh. He also won the prestigious Sushil Sarkar Award for his outstanding work in Commercial Design and Advertising.

Career
Jagmeet started his career as a Creative Director with an ad agency, Bates Clarion.

Zee TV Hindi 
Jagmeet Bal joined Zee TV in 1994 and worked as a Director for many popular shows.

Non-Fiction Shows
 Colgate Gel Yudlee Yu (Hosted by Amit Kumar
 Daak Ghar Apna Ghar
 Wah Kya Scene Hai
 Archies Top of the Top
 Mark Meri Marzi
 Positive Health Show

Later he moved to Zee Alpha and directed many popular shows.

Zee Alpha Punjabi 
 Sa Re Ga Ma Punjabi
 Sunehe
 Meriyan Galla Mere Geet
 Excuse Me Please 
 Guddi Chardi Jandi
 Maan Punjab De - Live Concert featuring Gurdas Maan, Harbhajjan Maan and Bhagwant Maan
 Apni Boli Apna Maan - Sufi Concert featuring Wadali Brothers, Hans Raj Hans, Harshdeep Kaur and Manpreet Akhtar, among others

Own Production House 
He soon started his own production house and worked as a Producer/Director for many popular music videos. He worked with popular artists like Gurdas Maan, Harshdeep Kaur, Jazzy B, Malkit Singh, Hans Raj Hans, Surjit Bindrakhia, Pammi Bai, Bhagwant Mann, Sardool Sikander, Amar Noorie, Bali Brahambhatt, and Sukhshinder Shinda.

Projects and Ad Campaigns

Dheeyan Da Satkaar Karo - Nanhi Chaan Foundation (Harsimrat Kaur Badal) 
Popular social awareness song featuring famous singers like Harshdeep Kaur, Harbhajjan Maan, and Hans Raj Hans. The song touches important issues of female foeticide and women empowerment.

Save The Girl Child  
He directed and wrote the script for a social awareness advertisement dealing with the sensitive issue of female foeticide.

Taare Zameen Par Foundation 
He directed and wrote the script for a social awareness advertisement for Taare Zameen Par Foundation, an NGO that empowers differently abled youth by providing a platform for their economic self-reliance.

Itihaas Akali Dal Da - A Project For Shiromani Akali Dal  
This campaign is a series of three music videos. The song glorifies and highlights the sacrifices made by the leaders of Shiromani Akali Dal.

Noor-e-Gobind - A Project For Bihar Government  
On the grand occasion of Sri Guru Gobind Singh Ji's 350th Birth Anniversary, an animated series of nine episodes depicting the early life of Sri Guru Gobind Singh Ji was released across the world. The project was conceived and directed by Jagmeet Bal and was presented by Bihar Government.

Nanak Sakhiyan - A Project For Punjab Government  
The year 2019 witnessed the biggest event of Sikh history - The 550th Birth Anniversary of Sri Guru Nanak Dev Ji. Nanak Sakhiyan was a series of 15 animated short stories from the life of Sri Guru Nanak Dev Ji. The stories were conceived and directed by Jagmeet Bal.
(Watch Here - Sakhiyan Guru Nanak Dev Ji | Babar | Guru Nanak Dev Ji Sakhi in Punjabi | Animated Film | Nanak Ji)

Guru Tegh Bahadur Ji - Hind Ki Chaadar - A Project Shiromani Gurdwara Parbandhak Committee  
The year 2019 witnessed the biggest event of Sikh history - The 550th Birth Anniversary of Sri Guru Nanak Dev Ji. Guru  Sakhiyan was a series of 15 animated short stories from the life of Sri Guru Nanak Dev Ji. The stories were conceived and directed by Jagmeet Bal.
(Watch Here - Sakhi GuruTeg Bahadur Ji | Life Story of Guru Tegh Bahadurji | Hind Ki Chadar | गुरु तेग बहादुर EP 1)

Satguru Nanak Aaye Ne  
Satguru Nanak Aaye Ne was an ode to Sri Guru Nanak Dev Ji on his 550th Birth Anniversary in November 2019. The song was directed by Jagmeet Bal. The song featured popular personalities from the Hindi Film industry, including Kapil Sharma, Shankar Mahadevan, Harshdeep Kaur, Jaspinder Narula, Sukhshinder Shinda, Shekhar Ravjiani, Shaan, Neeti Mohan, Richa Sharma, and Salim Merchant. The song was launched on The Kapil Sharma Show.

Virasat International Punjabi Film Festival and Awards (VIPFFA) - Australia 
Jagmeet Bal conceived and directed Virasat International Punjabi Film Festival and Awards (VIPFFA) 2016 in Melbourne, Australia. It was the biggest international Punjabi film award event, featuring over 80 well-known personalities from the Punjabi Film Industry and Bollywood.

Ad Campaigns For BJP Featuring Hema Malini and Smriti Irani  
Jagmeet Bal conceived and directed various ad campaigns for the BJP Government featuring Hema Malini and Smriti Irani.

TV Ad For Ruhil's Ready-To-Eat Meals - US-based Food Company

TV Ad For ESS ESS Bath Fittings

Films
Jagmeet Bal shot the song, Ranjhna, for the movie Sardaar Saab in New Zealand. (Watch Here: https://www.youtube.com/watch?v=Rat6v0gcNXA)

Jagmeet Bal is presently producing and directing films under his own banner - Jagmeet Bal Films.

Gallery

References

1972 births
Living people
Indian Sikhs
Punjabi people
Musicians from Chandigarh